Kristofer Wåhlander (born 12 November 1974, in Loddekopinge in southern Sweden), is a Swedish conductor. He founded the St. Petersburg Festival Orchestra in Russia in 2001 and recorded Tchaikovsky's 5th symphony on the La Forza label with the same orchestra (LFCD051).

Served as artistic director for the Nordic Music Festival in St. Petersburg from 2004-2007.

In 2008, he founded the Music at the Fort festival which turned the former military island of Flakfort into a festival of classical music.

Has also worked with the St. Petersburg Philharmonic Orchestra, the Kaliningrad Symphony Orchestra, the Iceland Symphony Orchestra, St. Petersburg State Symphony Orchestra, The St. Petersburg State Hermitage Orchestra, the academy of the Mariinsky Theater, South Juthland Symphony Orchestra and others.

Kristofer Wahlander studied at the Royal Northern College of Music in Manchester and at the St. Petersburg State Conservatory in Russia.

He was the subject for the one-hour documentary film 'Music - a matter of life or death' by the filmmaker Viveca Ringmar, broadcast on Swedish national television SVT in 2006.

Since 2010, Kristofer Wahlander directs and conducts the professional Lundaland Philharmonic Orchestra in the south of Sweden.

References 

St. Petersburg Times 3 Oct 2003St. Petersburg Times 13 May 2005
St. Petersburg Times 7 Oct 2005
St. Petersburg Times 27 January 2006
St. Petersburg Times 19 May 2006
St. Petersburg Times 6 Oct 2006

1974 births
Swedish conductors (music)
Male conductors (music)
Living people
21st-century conductors (music)
21st-century Swedish male musicians